This is a list of individual female winners in FIS Cross-Country World Cup from 1982 season to present.

Statistics 

 Distance: Competitions of distances longer than 1.8 km
 Sprint: Competitions of distances shorter than 1.8 km
 Stage events: Overall winners of Stage World Cup events (Ruka Triple, Lillehammer Triple, Tour de Ski, World Cup Final and other Tours)

Winners

FIS biographies

External links 
 International Ski Federation

race winners